Noël Ngiama Makanda known professionally as Werra Son, is a Congolese musician  December 25, 1965 in Moliambo, a small village in western DRC, in Kikwit region, Kwilu District. Werrason is one of the founding members of musical band Wenge Musica that was founded in 1981 while he was still studying for a degree in Accountancy. Werrason, and his college friends Didier Masela, Aimé Buanga, Machiro Kifaya and others formed the band and were later joined by J.B Mpiana. After the split of the original Wenge Musica, he co-founded Wenge Musica Maison Mère (WMMM) a musical band he created alongside Didier Masela and Adolphe Dominguez.

Career

Early years and formation of Wenge Musica Maison Mère (WMMM) 
When Werrason's college band Wenge Musica split in December 1997, Werrason, Masela, and Dominguez then created Wenge Musica Maison Mère, a band based at Zamba Playa in Kinshasa. With the help of among others Sankara de Kunta and Zacharie Babaswe, Werrason travelled the country to recruit young musicians; his primary band members were Masela, Dominguez, Ferre Gola, Baby Ndombe, Adjani Sesele, JDT Mulopwe, Celeo Scram, Bill Clinton Kalonji, Serge Mabiala, Didier Lacoste, Chou Lay, Michael Tee, guitarists Flamme Kapaya, Japonais Maladi, Christian Mwepu, and drummers Papy Kakol and Ali Mbonda. The band's first album, Force d'Intervention Rapide was released on November 28, 1998.

His song "Chantal Switzerland" became a noted song of the year, while his animator Bill Clinton Kalonji was voted best animator. Their second album, Solola Bien (1999) was successful in the African music scene, and earned the Gold Record in France.

In June 2001, Werrason released his first solo album Kibuisa Mpimpa, a double CD with 17 tracks. This recording was the result of five years of preparation, four months of studio work, and over 2,000 hours of writing.  This album won him two  Kora awards in South Africa, including "Best Artist" in Africa and "Best Album" in Central Africa.

Later that year, Werrason performed back-to-back concerts at Zénith Paris, one of the largest concert halls in France. He toured Europe including London, Amsterdam, Brussels, Dublin, Rome, and Stockholm. The United Nations have awarded him the title of Universal Ambassador of Peace. In 2001, Werrason was received by Pope John Paul II. Since then, he has spoken for UNESCO campaigns against AIDS and discrimination, and in campaigns against early marriages and to promote education for girls. During his world tour, performed with other African artists including Manu Dibango at the Paris Olympia, Passi, Doc Gynéco, and Benji and Akil. Werrason also collaborated with Shaggy. In the same year, Werrason performed a concert at Stade des Martyrs, which was attended by over 100,000 people. He also performed for 17,000 at Bercy in 2000.

Controversies 

In September 2021, the Parisian prefecture announced the cancellation of a large concert of Werrason which was to be held at the Zénith of Paris, citing "risks of serious disturbances to the public order and of attacking the safety of the spectators", in particular with threats of the demonstrations of radical opponents to the regime in place. Werrason has expressed his anger towards France.

Discography

Albums

2001: Kibuisa Mpimpa
2005: Temoignage
2014: Fleche Ingeta
2015: Sans Poteau 
2017: 7 Jours de la Semaine
2019: Formidable

Singles
2013: "I Found a Way" (feat. Mohombi)
2014: "Block Cadenas"
2017: "Diemba (Balançoire Générique)"
2017: "Conscience Bela"
2019: "Formidable"
2020: "Yeke Yeke" (feat. Bikorine & But Na Filet)

Featured in
2021: "RDV" (Picolcrist bil feat. Werrason)

References

External links
Official Website

1965 births
Living people
21st-century Democratic Republic of the Congo male singers
People from Kwilu Province
20th-century Democratic Republic of the Congo male singers